People's Television Network (abbreviated PTV) is the flagship state broadcaster owned by the Government of the Philippines. Founded in 1974, PTV is the main brand of People's Television Network, Inc. (PTNI), one of the attached agencies under the Presidential Communications Office (PCO). 

PTV, along with government-owned media companies Intercontinental Broadcasting Corporation and the Philippine Broadcasting Service-Bureau of Broadcast Services, forms the media arm of the PCO and acts as a primary state television broadcaster that focuses on news, information and public service programming. Its head office, studios and transmitter are located at Broadcast Complex, Visayas Avenue, Barangay Vasra, Diliman, Quezon City.

As a government-run station, PTV receives funding from the General Appropriations Act (Annual National Budget) and sales from blocktimers and advertisers, among others. PTV also runs a Muslim-oriented digital television channel Salaam TV.

History

In 1961, the Philippine government, through the Philippine Broadcasting Service established a government TV station called DZFM-TV Channel 10 which it time-shared with two other organizations. It was financed by government subsidy; the channel did not last long because of frequency allocation.

On September 28, 1972, after declaring martial law in the Philippines, Marcos ordered the takeover of ABS-CBN Corporation and turned over its facilities to Kanlaon Broadcasting System (KBS), controlled by Marcos crony Roberto Benedicto. ABS-CBN's facilities were later transferred from KBS to the government-owned Maharlika Broadcasting System. Under the Marcos dictatorship, crony-owned media companies broadcast or published news and entertainment meant to project a positive image for the dictatorship and conceal its abuses.

The country's government television network began operations on February 2, 1974, as Government Television (GTV-4), a division of the National Media Production Center. The government channel was first headed by Lito Gorospe and later by Press Secretary Francisco Tatad. It was first headquartered in the Solana Building in Intramuros, Manila and later relocated to the ABS-CBN Broadcasting Center in Bohol Avenue, Quezon City. In 1976, it began color broadcasts, the last national network to do so, when it became the long time home of the Philippine Basketball Association for almost two decades.

GTV was renamed Maharlika Broadcasting System (MBS) in 1980 under the leadership of Minister of Information Gregorio Cendaña. By then, it began expanding with the opening of provincial stations nationwide, including 3 stations in Cebu, Bacolod, and Davao who once owned by pre-martial law ABS-CBN.

MBS-4 was captured by rebel soldiers during the 1986 People Power Revolution. It was, during that very historic event in national history, initially called as New TV 4 but later rebranded as People's Television (PTV) two months later in April. Broadcasters Tina Monzón-Palma and José Mari Vélez were tapped by President Corazon Aquino to handle the newly rebranded station for a few months, before they returned to GMA 7. It later became the national network for the broadcasts of the 1988 Summer Olympics along with RPN.

On March 26, 1992, President Cory Aquino signed Republic Act 7306 turning PTV Network into a government corporation known formally as People's Television Network, Inc. The law also grants its congressional franchise for a period co-terminus with its corporate existence. Under Philippine law, no broadcast company can operate without franchise from the Philippine congress, an authority that limits and regulates operations of telecommunications and broadcast media such as televisions and radios.

Shortly after he took over the mantle of government in June 1992, President Fidel V. Ramos appointed PTV Network's first board of directors. The Network was given a one-time equity funding for capital outlay. Since 1992, PTV has been operating on revenues it generates on its own. Republic Act 7306 stipulates that the government shall not appropriate funds for the operations of the Network .

In 1992, PTNI went on full nationwide satellite broadcast using PALAPA C2. Its flagship station PTV-4, which is based in Quezon City, boasts of a 40-kilowatt brand-new transmitter facility sitting on a  tower. With its 32 provincial stations across the country, the network has extended its reach and coverage to approximately 85 percent of the television viewing public nationwide.

PTNI was given the Hall of Fame Award for Best Station and for Most Balanced Programming in 1987 and the Catholic Mass Media Awards in the two succeeding years after. It has aired several pioneering and award-winning educational, cultural and public service programs for their relevance and production excellence. In 1996, PTV won the award for Best TV Station ID ("Ang Network Para Sa Pilipino" [lit. The Network For The Filipino]) in the PMPC Star Awards for Television.

PTNI has pioneered educational and cultural programming. Some of its award-winning programs were Tele-aralan ng Kakayahan (which predated ABS-CBN's The Knowledge Channel by decades), Ating Alamin, Small World and its successor Kidsongs, For Art's Sake, Coast to Coast and Paco Park Presents. In the 1990s, at the core of its educational programming is the Continuing Studies via Television or CONSTEL, a program aimed at upgrading teaching skills of elementary and secondary teachers of Science and English. Institutionalized by Department of Education, Culture and Sports (DECS), CONSTEL Science and English are being used in teacher training by the Regional and Divisional Leader Schools of the Department of Education, culture and Sports and in Teacher Education Institutions of the Commission on Higher Education.

PTNI has also been the official broadcaster of major international sports competitions. It has covered the Olympic Games, starting with the 1988 Olympic Games in Seoul, except Barcelona Olympics in 1992 (covered by ABS-CBN), the Beijing Olympics in 2008 (covered by Solar Entertainment Corporation), London Olympics in 2012, Rio Olympics in 2016 and the Tokyo Olympics in 2021 (covered by TV5). PTNI was the carrying station of the South East Asian Games in 1991, 1995, 2005, and 2007, missing from 2009, and resuming at 2017; Asian Games from 1986 to 2006 and the IAAF World Championships in Athletics in 2007 and 2009. During these coverage, PTNI has received commendations from various sports organizations. In 1996, it received a presidential citation from then President Fidel V. Ramos for the successful coverage of the Atlanta Olympic Games.

On July 16, 2001, under the new management appointed by President Gloria Macapagal Arroyo, PTNI adopted the new image and name National Broadcasting Network (NBN) carrying a new slogan "One People. One Nation. One Vision." for a new image in line with its new programming thrusts, they continued the new name until the Aquino administration in 2010.

NBN expanded its broadcast reach with the launching of NBN World on February 19, 2003, in cooperation with the Television and Radio Broadcasting Service (TARBS). This global expansion signals new directions for NBN as it becomes accessible to the rest of the world, particularly the millions of Filipinos overseas. NBN can be seen in Australia, North America and the Asia-Pacific. NBN was transmitted via satellite nationwide using Agila 2 before moving to ABS 1 (now ABS 2) in September 2011 (Now in Telstar 18 as of present time).

Before the year 2010, NBN main studios in Quezon City and its regional stations in Baguio, Cebu and Naga will be equipped with the most modern news gathering equipment for them to compete with the major television networks. Also, a new Harris Transmitter has been installed. NBN's transmitter power shall be increased from 40 kW to 60 kW (However, few years later, in 2013, the network was downgraded its transmitting power output from 60 kW to 50 kW later then back to 40 kW or 25 kW in June 2016 to control power costs). NBN's digital channel is now available on UHF channel 48 (moved to UHF channel 42 and later UHF channel 14) using the Japanese digital TV standard.

In 2011, NBN continued to enhance its digital broadcasting capabilities with equipment donated from the Japanese government.
This equipment will also allow NBN to begin broadcasting emergency alerts when necessary (similar to the Emergency Alert System in the United States, but it is more likely, due to the usage of the Japanese digital TV standard, that the system would be based on the Japanese J-Alert system).

Although the branding is officially known as the National Broadcasting Network, in August 2011, the "People's Television" brand which was retired in 2001 was reintroduced as a secondary brand until a few months later, PTNI became a primary brand on October 6, 2011. The People's Television and National Broadcasting Network names and logos were then concurrently used from October 6, 2011 to January 16, 2012 as the NBN logo is still used on the network's sign-on and sign-off until the said date of January 2012.

On July 2, 2012, PTV launched its new logo and its new slogan "Telebisyon ng Bayan (lit. People's Television)" with a Balangay station ID.

In March 2013, President Benigno Aquino III signed Republic Act 10390, superseding the old Charter, in which the management will be under reorganization and the government will infuse P5 billion to PTV to revitalize the station and make it "digital competitive" in spite of GMA Network's questionings of the law, fearing that it may enter competition. PTV has earned P59 million generated revenues for the first and second quarter of 2014.

PTV has started their modernization program since 2012, including the acquisition of studio technical equipment, cameras, vehicles and high-powered transmitter for the main office in Visayas Avenue, Quezon City, together with few regional offices, included in their plans is the rehabilitation of PTV stations in Naga, Baguio, Iloilo, Cebu, Zamboanga, Cotabato, Calbayog, Tacloban, Pagadian and Dumaguete.

Despite being operated with little or no budget, the new PTV had still managed to cover the biggest events in the country including the 2013 National and Local Elections, 2013 Central Visayas earthquake, Typhoon Ondoy (Ketsana), the visits of US President Barack Obama and Pope Francis, the APEC Philippines 2015. and the 2016 National and Local Elections. PTV also reintroduced its broadcast of the station's digital clock embedded on the lower left part of the screen in 2013, 7 years after Radio Philippines Network abandoned its longstanding practice for 32 years.

In 2005, several Radio ng Bayan programs were also aired on then NBN with the Visayas Avenue studios used for some of them, under the Tinig ng Bayan banner. In 2014, the partnership between the two was revived with an all new morning news program, RadyoBisyon, which is also simulcast on IBC-13 and heard in Radyo ng Bayan stations nationwide, broadcasting from its own studios and the RnB radio booth. Before the launch, RnB - as part of the Philippine Broadcasting Service - had already, since 2012, been simulcasting News @ 1 and News @ 6 on radio on all its stations.

Recent developments

Under then-Presidential Communications Secretary Martin Andanar, the network was set to implement a revitalization plan to improve the station's programming and expand its nationwide presence, to be at par with state-media outfits BBC of United Kingdom, NHK of Japan, PBS of the United States of America, CBC of Canada and ABC Australia. He will be also implement editorial independence in the station. Andanar noted that teams from state-owned networks ABC and BBC will be sent to the Philippines to help with PTV's revitalization plan. He also tapped a former executive of ABS-CBN News, Charie Villa, to oversee the news division of PTV-4. However, Villa turned down the offer due to her strong opposition on key national issues.

In June, President-elect Rodrigo Duterte stated that he will no longer conduct press conferences, and instead air announcements and press releases through PTV. Two months later, his promise was retracted, and the press interviews and conferences resumed on the channel.

On June 17, 2016, the PTV and Japan signed a 38.20 million yen worth of Cultural Grant Aid and acquisition of programs from NHK to improve the network's overall programming. Within weeks, NHK's Japan Video Topics returned to the channel after several years. However, 1 year later on July 11, 2017, PTV and the Japan International Cooperation Agency (JICA) signed an agreement on another cultural grant aid for the planned broadcast of 600 educational and cultural programs from Japanese state-owned broadcaster NHK in the channel thru the ISDB-T digital TV standard.

On July 7, 2016, PTNI Chairperson Maria Cristina C. Mariano, PTNI Vice-chairperson Veronica Baluyut-Jimenez, Network General Manager Albert D. Bocobo, and Board Directors Josemaria Claro and Cindy Rachelle Igmat, all appointed during the Aquino administration, tendered their resignation to Duterte through Andanar. and followed by the "Telebisyon ng Bayan" slogan was dropped from the logo, retaining the 2012 PTV logo until April 2, 2017. 3 days later, former PTNI acting News and Administrative Division head, Alex Rey V. Pal takes over as Officer in Charge of the network temporary and while Bocobo retains as General Manager of the Network until November 24, 2016. Andanar also announced the appointment of Dino Antonio C. Apolonio, former vice president for Production Engineering of TV5 as the incoming Network General Manager. However, 4 months later, on November 25, 2016, it was officially announced that PTV named Apolonio was appointed as the Network General Manager replacing Bocobo and he also assumed as Chief Operating Officer (COO) of the network, while the network's board member Claro was also appointed as Network Vice Chairperson.

GOCC Undersecretary George Apacible announced during the network's Christmas party on December 20, 2016, that PTV sets its sights to notch higher in the television ratings by 2017 as the network targets the #3 spot currently held by TV5.

On January 4, 2017, PCOO Secretary Martin Andanar announced that PTV's transmitter power output was increased from 25 kW to 60 kW for a clearer and better signal reception.

On January 12, 2017, PTV and Japan-based IT company NEC signed an agreement for the commissioning of new digital transmitters and head-end system for the network's transition to digital terrestrial television. The network is all set to roll-out its digital terrestrial television service initially on six locations in the Philippines by introducing DTT transmitters and compression multiplexers in Manila, Baguio, Naga, Guimaras, Cebu and Davao in the Philippines by July 2017. 1 year later on January 10, 2018, Minister for Internal Affairs and Communications of Japan Seiko Noda and PCOO Secretary Martin Andanar together with PCOO officials visited at the PTV studios in Quezon City for the ceremonial Switch on of PTV's Digital Terrestrial Television Broadcast.

A new logo of PTV, which was conceptualized by former PTV senior graphic artist LA (replacing its 2012 version), was previewed on the March 11, 2017, edition of PTV Newsbreak in the occasion of the inauguration of the station's Cordillera hub in Baguio. Along with the inauguration, the government turned over brand-new Outside Broadcast and Digital Satellite News Gathering Vans. The inauguration was led by President Duterte and PCO Secretary Martin Andanar. The transition to  the new logo started on April 3 of the same year, when PTV released its wordmark logo, its corresponding station ID, and new graphics. Finally, its official logo, which represents the elements of the Philippine flag and also previewed at the inauguration of its very own Cordillera hub, was launched upon the station's sign-on on June 28, 2017. The network also launched its new slogan "Para sa Bayan (lit. For the Nation)", which was already used since July 2016 (prior to the re-branding).

On June 3, 2017, PTV began simulcasting CGTN programs, part of its staff having visited its facilities earlier in the year as part of a number of training visits to state and private TV channels worldwide, and later started their full-blown broadcast in 1080i Full HD on their Digital Terrestrial Television Broadcast on April 18, 2018.

A year since the network introduced their new logo, the new-look PTV was relaunched to the public in a trade launch on July 12, 2018, at the Marquis Events Place, Taguig. During the trade launch, the network showcased their technological achievements since the new administration took over the network's operations in 2016, from upgrading the technical and transmission equipment into HD and Digital TV–ready to their social media presence and their revitalized program line-up from news & public affairs programs, local newscasts from Cordillera and Davao, documentaries, sports, entertainment, and public service shows co-produced by the network and their partner government agencies, along with upcoming local and foreign programs, including those from China, Japan, South Korea and the ASEAN Region. PTV went on a major visual facelift with the airing of their new Station ID entitled "Kasama Mo, Para sa Bayan" (lit. Your Companion, For The Nation), which started on the following day.

In his first State of the Nation Address, President Rodrigo Duterte proposed the creation of a law that will merge and integrate the People's Television Network and the Philippine Broadcasting Service into a single entity, to be called the People's Broadcasting Corporation (PBC), similar to the BBC. The proposed PBC will also launch the country's first Specialty channels for the Muslim minority (Salaam TV) and the Lumad peoples of the south. PBC will also put up TV broadcasting hubs in Visayas and Mindanao, aside from its main headquarters in Luzon and TV broadcast studios within its major cities. Salaam TV began test broadcasting on July 10, 2017.

Programming

Generally, PTV airs locally produced news and public affairs programs and documentaries, sports, movies, dramas, public service and entertainment programs, in addition to foreign content coming from their counterparts from China, Japan, South Korea and the ASEAN–member countries, and blocktime programs. The network serves as the main television broadcast arm of the government of the Republic of the Philippines and it is part of the Office of the Press Secretary. Its programming is diverse from other state-controlled network IBC since PTV focuses on its function as the government's voice, while IBC is the general entertainment channel which also airs replays of select PTV programs.

PTV Stations Nationwide (PTV Regional)

PTV Website
The  PTV Website is another initiative of People's Television Network to reach out to all Filipinos worldwide using the internet. It is solely maintained by DO of the New Media Unit. The PTV website features free live video streaming of PTV's flagship station programs from Quezon City, Philippines.

See also
 Intercontinental Broadcasting Corporation
 Philippine Broadcasting Service
 Radio Philippines Network
 Salaam TV (Philippine TV channel)

References

External links
 

 
1974 establishments in the Philippines
Publicly funded broadcasters
Television networks in the Philippines
Television channels and stations established in 1974
Companies based in Quezon City
Presidential Communications Group (Philippines)
State media
International broadcasters
Government-owned and controlled corporations of the Philippines
Filipino-language television stations